Class 41 may refer to:

DRG Class 41, a Deutsche Reichsbahn German steam locomotive type
British Rail Class 41 (Warship Class), prototype diesel locomotives
British Rail Class 41 (HST) - prototype High Speed Train power cars
Belgian Railways Class 41, diesel multiple units